The September 2010 Democratic Party of Japan leadership election was held on 14 September 2010 after the incumbent party President Naoto Kan who served the remain of Yukio Hatoyama's term came to an end at the same time Kan bets for his election. On August 26, 2010 the "Shadow Shōgun" Ichirō Ozawa declared his candidacy to challenge Kan for leadership and premiership.

President Results

Party Election

Party Parliamentary votes

 3 invalid vote
 2 abstention

References

External links
Democratic Party: presidential election 2010 

2010 elections in Japan
Political party leadership elections in Japan
Democratic Party (Japan, 1998) leadership election